Darran Andrew Hay (born 17 December 1969 in Hitchin, England), is an English former footballer who played as a forward. He played in the Football League for Cambridge United and in non-League football for Biggleswade Town, Woking, Stevenage Borough, Chesham United, Carshalton Athletic, Harrow Borough, Hitchin Town, King's Lynn, Aylesbury United and Arlesey Town.

Honours 
Woking
 FA Trophy: 1993–94, 1994–95, 1996–97

References

External links

Darran Hay profile at Aylesbury United

1969 births
Living people
English footballers
People from Hitchin
Biggleswade Town F.C. players
Cambridge United F.C. players
Woking F.C. players
Stevenage F.C. players
Chesham United F.C. players
Carshalton Athletic F.C. players
Harrow Borough F.C. players
Hitchin Town F.C. players
King's Lynn F.C. players
Aylesbury United F.C. players
Arlesey Town F.C. players
National League (English football) players
Southern Football League players
Association football forwards